The Hinckley High School Gymnasium, located off US 5/50 or at 100 East south of 200 North, in Hinckley, Utah, was built in 1935–36.  It was listed on the National Register of Historic Places in 1985.

It is an Art Deco style building, deemed significant as representing the New Deal programs in Utah.

The architect was Scott & Welch and it was built by Talboe & Litchfield.

References

Gyms in the United States
National Register of Historic Places in Millard County, Utah
Art Deco architecture in Utah
Buildings and structures completed in 1935
Schools in Millard County, Utah
High schools in Utah
School buildings on the National Register of Historic Places in Utah
Sports venues on the National Register of Historic Places in Utah